Jeanne Marie Labourbe (8 April 1877 — 2 March 1919) was a French Bolshevik and activist who participated in the October Revolution. She died in 1919 in Odessa, executed by the police as ordered by the White Russians.

Biography 
Jeanne Labourbe was born in Lapalisse, a small town South-East of Allier, where she worked from a young age at a laundry. Her father, Claude Labourbe, and her mother, Marie Labbé, had 5 children together, of which Jeanne was the third. Since the bloody uprising of Lapalisse against the coup d'état of 1851, a strong feeling of republicanism and social justice was deep rooted in the region. It was the incredible political commitment of Louis-Simon Dereure, one of the first leaders of the International Workingmen's Association and a member of the Paris Commune, that inspired Labourbe's political trajectory.

In 1894, aged 17, Labourbe found a job offer to be a French reader in Poland, which was still a part of the Russian Empire at the time. She decided to leave for Poland and was hired as a governess and French reader for a Polish family from Tomaszów Mazowiecki.

After several years, she became a teacher and joined the Russian Social Democratic Labour Party at the time of the 1905 Russian Revolution. In 1917, she participated in the October Revolution and, on 30 August, 1918, she founded the French Communist Group in Moscow alongside Jacques Sadoul, Pierre Pascal and Inessa Armand.

Georges Clemenceau, supporting the ideals of the Russian counter-revolutionaries, sent a squadron of the french maritime fleet to Odessa, looking to militarily suppress the spread of mutinies in the Black Sea. When Jeanne Labourbe found out about the landings, 18 December, 1918, she volunteered to help the port city in a policy of propaganda and defence of the Bolshevik Revolution. In particular, she published a Le Communiste newsletter, written in French, directed at the French forces. However, despite their efforts, the city of Odessa fell to the influence of the White Russians. The police raided a Bolshevik committee meeting, 2 March, 1919, which was attended by Labourbe, and opened fire on the ten militants present, who were tortured and executed.

Tributes 
Several French cities have named a street of theirs "Jeanne Labourbe"; to name some, Lapalisse, Saint-Pierre-des-Corps, Fleury-les-Aubrais, Vierzon, Varennes-Vauzelles, Saint-Martin-d'Hères, Tremblay-en-France, Lanester, Montluçon, Fontaine, Saran and Vénissieux.

References

Inline

Bibliography 
 John Reed, Dix jours qui ébranlèrent le monde, Éditions Boni & Liveright, New York, 1919.
 Jean Fréville, Une révolutionnaire française de la Révolution russe : Jeanne Labourbe. Cahiers de l'Institut Maurice Thorez. N°13. First quartre 1969.
 Annie Kriegel, Aux origines du communisme français : contribution à l'histoire du mouvement français., Éditions Flammarion, Paris, 1970.
 Alfred Rosmer, Moscou sous Lénine : les origines du communisme. (see Jeanne Labourbe). Edition F. Maspero, Paris, 1970.
 Roland Gaucher, Histoire secrète du Parti Communiste Français. 1920-1974. Edition Albin Michel, 1974.
 Ludmila Zak, Des Français dans la Révolution d'Octobre, Éditions sociales, Paris, 1976.
 Pierre Pascal, En Communisme : mon journal de Russie. 1918-1921. Volume II. Edition l'Age d'homme. 1977.
 Jacques Raphaël-Leygues and Jacques Barré, Les mutins de la mer noire - Avril 1919, des marins français se révoltent, Éditions Plon, Paris, 1981.
 Philippe Masson, La marine et la mer noire 1918-1919. Edition de la Sorbonne, 1982.
 Marcel Body, Les groupes communistes français de Russie 1918-1922, Edition Allia, Paris, 1988. 2015 reissue.
 Antoine Perraud, Octobre 17. Jeanne Labourbe, l’institutrice française tuée à Odessa, sur Mediapart, 26 July 2017 read online.
 François Bonnet, Des vies en Révolution, ces destins saisis par Octobre 17. Médiapart. Don Quichotte Editions, 2017.
 Bernard Lecomte, Histoire du communisme pour les nuls. ( Un portrait : Jeanne Labourbe ), Edition First, Paris, October, 2017.

19th-century French women
20th-century French women
Bolsheviks
1877 births
1919 deaths
French activists